Basil Edward Hammond (10 August 1842 – 6 December 1916) was an English historian, Fellow of Trinity College, Cambridge.

He is buried in the Ascension Parish Burial Ground with his wife Margaret, daughter of Rev. Francis & Anne Slater.

Publications
 The Political Institutions of the Ancient Greeks, 1895
 Outlines of Comparative Politics, 1903
 Bodies Politic and their Governments, 1915

References

External links
 

1842 births
1916 deaths
Fellows of Trinity College, Cambridge